Philo Vance Returns is a 1947 American mystery film directed by William Beaudine and starring William Wright, Vivian Austin and Leon Belasco. It is one of a series of films featuring private detective Philo Vance.

Plot
Vance investigates the murders of a newly engaged couple.

Cast
 William Wright as Philo Vance 
 Vivian Austin as Lorena Blendon Simms
 Leon Belasco as Alexis Karnoff 
 Clara Blandick as Stella Blendon 
 Ramsay Ames as Virginia Berneaux 
 Damian O'Flynn as Larry Blendon 
 Frank Wilcox as George Hullman 
 Iris Adrian as Maggie McCarthy Blendon
 Ann Staunton as Helen Varney Blendon 
 Tim Murdock as The Policeman 
 Mary Scott as Mary, the Maid

References

Bibliography
 Marshall, Wendy L. William Beaudine: From Silents to Television. Scarecrow Press, 2005.

External links

1947 films
American mystery films
American black-and-white films
1947 mystery films
1940s English-language films
Films directed by William Beaudine
Films scored by Albert Glasser
Producers Releasing Corporation films
1940s American films
Philo Vance films